Felix Eriksson may refer to:
 Felix Eriksson (ice hockey)
 Felix Eriksson (footballer)